Berkeley protests may refer to:

 1960s Berkeley protests, a series of events at the University of California, Berkeley, and Berkeley, California, U.S.
 Berkeley Marine Corps Recruiting Center protests, series of protest begun by Code Pink in 2007 in Berkeley, California, U.S.
 2017 Berkeley protests, a series of protests and clashes between organized groups that occurred in the city of Berkeley, California, U.S.